Dumisani Matyeshana (born 11 February 1981 in East London) is a South African rugby union player for club side Rustenburg Impala.

References

1981 births
Living people
People from Mdantsane
South African rugby union players
Border Bulldogs players
Leopards (rugby union) players
Sharks (Currie Cup) players
Rugby union fullbacks
Rugby union players from East London, Eastern Cape